The community health center (CHC) in the United States is the dominant model for providing integrated primary care and public health services for the low-income and uninsured, and represents one use of federal grant funding as part of the country's health care safety net. The health care safety net can be defined as a group of health centers, hospitals, and providers willing to provide services to the nation's uninsured and underserved population, thus ensuring that comprehensive care is available to all, regardless of income or insurance status. According to the U.S. Census Bureau, 29 million people in the country (9.1% of the population) were uninsured in 2015. Many more Americans lack adequate coverage or access to health care. These groups are sometimes called "underinsured". CHCs represent one method of accessing or receiving health and medical care for both underinsured and uninsured communities.

CHCs are organized as non-profit, clinical care providers that operate under comprehensive federal standards. The two types of clinics that meet CHC requirements are those that receive federal funding under Section 330 of the Public Health Service Act and those that meet all requirements applicable to federally funded health centers and are supported through state and local grants. Both types of CHCs are designated as "Federally Qualified Health Centers" (FQHCs), which grants them special payment rates under Medicare, Medicaid, and the Children's Health Insurance Program (CHIP). To receive Section 330 grant funds, CHCs must meet the following qualifications:

Be located in a federally designated medically under-served area (MUA) or serve medically under-served populations (MUP)
Provide comprehensive primary care
Adjust charges for health services on a sliding fee schedule according to patient income
Be governed by a community board of which a majority of members are patients at the CHC

CHCs place great value in being patient-centered. Uniquely in community health centers, at least 51% of all governing board members must be patients of the clinic. This policy creates interesting implications in terms of how "participatory" CHCs are, as governing board members become directly invested in the quality of the clinic. A sliding fee scale based on income is implemented so that the cost of care is proportionate to the patient's ability to pay. The purpose of these stipulations is to ensure that CHCs are working alongside the community, instead of just serving the community, in order to improve access to care.

Community health centers that receive federal funding through the Health Resources and Services Administration, an agency of the U.S. Department of Health and Human Services, are also called "Federally Qualified Health Centers".  There are now more than 1,250 federally supported FQHCs with more than 8,000 service delivery sites.  They are community health centers, migrant health centers, health care for the homeless centers, and public housing primary care centers that deliver primary and preventive health care to more than 20 million people in all 50 states, the District of Columbia, Puerto Rico, the Virgin Islands, and the Pacific Basin.

History 
According to historian John Duffy, the concept of community health centers in the United States can be traced to infant milk stations in New York City in 1901. In November, 1914, the city established the first district health center in New York at 206 Madison Avenue, serving 35,000 residents of Manhattan's lower east side.  The staff consisted of one medical inspector and three nurses stationed permanently in the district who, through a house card system, developed a complete health record of each family.  In 1915, the system expanded, adding four district centers in Queens. Wartime and political pressures ended this development in New York City, but privately funded clinics through the New York Association for Improving the Condition of the Poor were started in 1916 (Bowling Green Neighborhood Association), 1917 (Columbus Hill Health Center), 1918 (Mulberry Street Health Center) and 1921 (Judson Health Center). Founded by Eleanor A. Campbell in Greenwich Village, the Judson Health Center became the largest health center in the U.S. by 1924.

The official establishment of community health centers was caused by the civil rights movement of the 1960s. The Office of Economic Opportunity (OEO) established what was initially called "neighborhood health centers" as a War on Poverty demonstration program. The aim of these clinics was to provide access points to health and social services to medically under-served and disenfranchised populations. The health centers were intended to serve as a mechanism for community empowerment. Accordingly, federal funds for the clinics went directly to nonprofit, community-level organizations. The health centers were designed and run with extensive community involvement to ensure that they remained responsive to community needs.

Under the modern definition, the first community health center in the United States was the Columbia Point Health Center in Dorchester, Massachusetts, which opened in December 1965. The center was founded by two medical doctors - H. Jack Geiger, who had been on the faculty of Harvard University and later at Tufts University, and Count Gibson, also from Tufts University. Geiger had previously studied the first community health centers and the principles of community-oriented primary care with Sidney Kark and colleagues while serving as a medical student in rural Natal, South Africa. The federal government's Office of Economic Opportunity (OEO) funded the Columbia Point Health Center, which served the poor community living in the Columbia Point Public Housing Projects located on an isolated peninsula far away from Boston City Hospital. On its twenty-fifth anniversary in 1990, the center was rededicated as the Geiger-Gibson Community Health Center and is still in operation.

In 1967, Geiger and Gibson also established a rural community health center, the Tufts-Delta Health Center (now the Delta Health Center), in Mound Bayou, Bolivar County, Mississippi to serve the poverty-stricken Bolivar County. This center was also set up in conjunction with Tufts University with a grant from the OEO. While the Columbia Point Health Center was set in an urban community, the Delta Health Center represented a rural model, and included educational, legal, dietary, and environmental programs in addition to the health services carries out at the center and throughout the county by its public health nurses. The War on Poverty enlisted many idealistic men, such as Leon Kruger, the first Director of the CHC at Mound Bayou. As a result, many families such as his, were drafted in the War on Poverty, often at their own risk.

In the early 1970s, the health centers program was transferred to the Department of Health, Education, and Welfare (HEW). The HEW has since become the U.S. Department of Health and Human Services (HHS). Within HHS, the Health Resources and Services Administration (HRSA), Bureau of Primary Health Care (BPHC) currently administers the program.

Community health centers are primarily funded by Medicaid payments and federal grants set up by Section 330 of the Public Health Service Act. In 2010, the Community Health Center Fund was created by Congress to aid in the expansion of community health centers. Since the 2013 fiscal year, discretionary funding from Congress has flatlined at approximately $1.5 billion but increased to $1.6 billion in 2018 via the Consolidated Appropriations Act of 2018. Funding has increased for CHCs, allowing them to increase their reach, staffing, and the services they can provide. Between 2010 and 2017, the number of operating sites increased by over 4,000, and shares of centers providing mental health services increased by 22%.

Since the Affordable Care Act's expansion of Medicaid, a challenge facing community health centers—and the health care safety net as a whole—is how to attract newly insured patients, who now have more options in terms of where to seek care, in order to remain financially viable.

The evolution of the terminology used to describe what are now called "community health centers" is crucial to understanding their history and how they are contextualized in the United States social safety net. When they were titled "neighborhood health centers", heavy emphasis was placed on grassroots community involvement and empowerment. Since, the terms have shifted to "community health centers" and "Federally Qualified Health Centers", indicating how these clinics have transformed into government provisions, and are now subject to bureaucratization. While CHCs still retain their historical commitment to responding to community needs, through mechanisms such as requiring at least 51% of governing board members to be patients at the health center, their positioning as a government provision makes CHCs responsible for meeting federal requirements as well.

Patient demographics
Community health centers primarily provide health care to patients who are uninsured or covered by Medicaid. In 2007, almost 40% of all CHC patients lacked insurance, and 35% were Medicaid patients. In 2008, 1,080 CHCs provided comprehensive primary care to more than 17.1 million people. CHC patients typically have low family incomes, live in medically under-served communities, and have complicated health conditions. 70% of CHC patients in 2007 had family incomes of no more than 100% of the federal poverty level; more than 90% of patients had family incomes at or below twice the poverty level.  Health center patients are also ethnically diverse. In 2007, half of all CHC patients were minorities, a third of which were Hispanic. All together, CHCs serve one in four low-income, minority residents. CHC patients are more likely to reside in rural areas relative to the rest of the population. They tend to be younger in age and are more likely to be female. In 2008, 36% of all CHC patients were children, and almost three in five patients were female.

Many CHC patients suffer from chronic conditions such as diabetes, asthma, hypertension, or substance abuse. CHC patients are more likely to report these chronic conditions than adults from the national population. Characteristics linked to serious health problems, such as smoking and obesity rates, are also significantly higher in adult CHC patients compared to the general population. High rates of mental health conditions, including depression and anxiety, also contribute to the overall high rates of chronic illness in CHCs. Nonetheless, as of 2016, 91% of CHCs report having met at least one or more of Healthy People 2020 goals.

Immigrants and community health centers

Immigrants are some of the primary patients that community health centers serve due to the cultural and societal barriers the group experiences. From the 1970s up to the early 2000s, the effect on immigrant families has increased relative to families native to the U.S. due to factors such as parental education, parental employment, and racial/ethnic composition. However, immigrant families generally have a lower access to mental healthcare, leaving them at a greater risk to not treat their mental health issues. Part of this problem lays in the foundations of immigrant communities, as many non-Western cultures perceive a strong stigma towards mental health topics and lack a proper system of social support to address these issues. Even more common is the lack of understanding or awareness that these mental health help resources exist. Due to complexities in how insurance and healthcare works, which is compounded by language barriers, many immigrant families are unable to properly educate themselves on what services exist and how they may utilize these services. For those who are able to understand, lack of outreach may lead them to assume that they are ineligible, when, in fact, they are eligible to receive such services. The effects of this lack of understanding especially harms immigrant children, who rely on their parents' knowledge of mental healthcare, who may inadvertently deny their children of needed mental health services.

One proposed solution to this problem is through community health centers (CHC), which are able to provide a unique service experience for the population it serves. For many of these CHCs, they must adapt to the geographical space it inhabits, in addition to cultural and linguistic variations in the surrounding demographics. As a result, they are equipped to address social stigmas present in their communities, an obstacle that hinders the use of available mental health resources. Additionally, CHCs also have the capability of overcoming local institutional barriers that may make it difficult or uncomfortable for immigrant groups to seek out healthcare. By providing translator services or linguistically appropriate health materials, for example, members of the local community are more empowered to educate themselves on mental health issues and solutions, as the information is provided in a form that is easily understood.

Due to successes in some CHCs in impacting their communities, policies like the early 2000s Medicaid reform and the Bush Administration's health center initiative allowed for expansion of behavioral healthcare services in CHCs. Previously, there were large restrictions on reimbursement for these services, causing them to be very costly. However, the advent of such policies show a movement that trends towards further increases in healthcare accessibility. Policies like the Affordable Care Act (ACA) and Chapter 58 have incrementally increased accessibility to healthcare, simultaneously setting a precedent for even further expansion.

Community health centers in California

Asian Health Services 
One example of a community health center that serves immigrants is Asian Health Services (AHS) in Oakland, CA. Asian Health Services aims to provide health, social, and advocacy services for the immigrant and refugee Asian community by entailing many of the strategies previously discussed. Additionally, they provide primary care services, including mental health, case management, nutrition, and dental care in English and 14 languages: Korean, ASL, Lao, Burmese, Mandarin, Cantonese, French, Mien, Karen, Mongolian, Karenni, Tagalog, Khmer, and Vietnamese. Their youth program provides services including health education, cultural awareness, job training, and college readiness to East Bay Asian American youth.

Youth Program 
In addition to their main clinic they also have a youth program that attempts to address the stigma about mental and sexual health in Asian culture by recruiting local Asian American youth to get involved with advocacy and create educational resources/workshops surrounding these topics. Many Asian Americans, though a very diverse group, have historically felt discouraged from seeking help for mental health concerns due to stigma and pressure to focus on academic and professional success. Additionally, the “model minority” myth plays a role in Asian Americans not seeking support for mental health.

Asian Health Services Youth Program (AHSYP) attempts to address these concerns using methods that Asian American immigrant youth claim would help. In a study on school-based mental health for Asian American immigrant youth, students suggested engaging students and parents, using peers to share their experiences to reduce stigma, and providing educational videos and materials. AHSYP also provides educational material through its social media outlets and workshops.

Project: Revive Chinatown! 
In the early 2000s, Asian Health Services envisioned a project called Revive Chinatown! that would create a safer pedestrian environment, while also transforming Oakland, California Chinatown's commercial district into a regional shopping destination. The key to securing the funding and support for this project was in re-defining the issue from one of public health into one of environmental justice. In doing so, Asian Health Services hoped to address the issue of pedestrian safety by simultaneously working on a long-term solution for increased quality of life. The Revive Chinatown! movement has gained traction and is cited as a success story of a CHC being able to successfully create a more public health-friendly environment, which bolsters their case and contributes to the trend towards further healthcare accessibility by means of CHCs.

Services 
Integration of health care services is a major emphasis of community health centers, in addition to the provision of preventive and comprehensive care. Services provided can vary depending upon the site, but frequently include primary care, dental care, counseling services, women's health services, podiatry, mental and behavioral health services, substance abuse services, and physiotherapy. Often, CHCs are the only local source of dental, mental health, and substance abuse care available to low-income patients.

Most recently, CHCs have played an increasing role in the opioid epidemic by facilitating access to treatment. CHCs have experienced an increase in the number of patients with opioid use disorder (OUD) from 2015 to 2018. As part of the substance use disorders (SUD) component of services provided by CHCs, services have been added and expanded relating to the prevention and treatment of opioid use disorder. The number of CHCs that provide services for SUD has increased from 20% in 2010, to 28% in 2018. There has been a 36% increase in the number of full-time staff at CHCs who are trained to provide SUD services. As of the federal budget for the 2019 fiscal year, over $5 billion has been requested for the Department of Health and Human Services to use over the upcoming five years towards addressing the opioid epidemic. Of that request, $350 million has already been available for grants to be awarded by the start of the 2019 fiscal year.

Because patients can come from a diverse range of socioeconomic, educational, cultural, and linguistic backgrounds, CHCs offer additional public health services unrelated to direct care, such as health promotion and education, advocacy and intervention, translation and interpretation, and case management. CHCs emphasize empowerment, so they also have programs to help eligible patients apply to federally funded health coverage programs, such as Medicaid.

Additionally, CHCs place great emphasis on meeting community needs. To meet this goal, administrative and health care personnel meet regularly to focus on the health care needs of the particular community that they are trying to serve. Individual CHCs will often provide specialized programs tailored to the populations they serve. These populations could include specific minority groups, the elderly, or the homeless. To determine what the community's needs may be, CHC staff may decide to engage in community-based participatory research. The success of community health centers depends on collaborative relationships with community members, industry, government, hospitals and other health care services and providers.

Quality of care 
Quality of care at CHCs can be assessed through many measurements and indices, including the availability of preventative services, treatment and management of chronic diseases, other health outcomes, cost effectiveness, and patient satisfaction. According to several studies, the quality of care at community health centers is comparable to the quality of care provided by private physicians. However, one major challenge that community health centers face is that the population that they serve is usually dealing with many other factors that can also detrimentally affect their health. As CHCs primarily treat the low-income and uninsured, many of their patients do not regularly see a primary care physician, which can lead to poorer health outcomes. Additionally, there is research to indicate that many CHC patients delay seeking health care because they hold a negative view of the health care safety net and expect discrimination from CHCs.

It is crucial for CHCs to evaluate the quality of care they provide in order to meet federal requirements and to fulfill their mission of eliminating health disparities based on socio-economic and insurance status.

Only recently has an evaluation program been instituted for CHCs. Such a program did exist briefly from 2002 to 2004; the Agency for Healthcare Research and Quality (AHRQ) and HRSA jointly monitored CHC providers. As of 2016, the HRSA utilizes the Uniform Data System to gather performance data from all health center grantees (FQHCs) and their look-alikes, which would include CHCs as well. Reporting instructions for the annual UDS report include information on patient demographics, clinical processes and outcomes, services, costs, and more. UDS data has been used to provide a health center adjusted quartile, which ranks the clinical performance of a health center in comparison to other health centers with similar characteristics such as minorities served, etc. In addition, external organizations such as The Center for Health Design, Kaiser Permanente, and the CDC also offer evaluation tools for CHCs.

Continuity of care 
Community health center patients are less likely to seek medical care consistently, as many of these patients tend to be from vulnerable populations in terms of socioeconomic background and insurance status. Nevertheless, those who use community health centers as a regular source of care are likely to have a positive patient experience and receive high-quality preventative services.

Medicaid's shift to managed care has helped create more medical homes for patients, allowing for greater continuity of care within CHCs.

Preventive services 
Studies have indicated that CHCs provide preventive services at similar rates to private physicians. Preventative services studied included cancer screenings, diet and exercise counseling, and immunizations. CHCs performing higher than private providers in terms of immunization rates, but lower in terms of diet and exercise counseling.

Specialty care 
Although CHCs are able to provide comprehensive primary care, they are limited in their ability to provide specialty care due to a lack of providers. The people affected most by this scarcity in services are the uninsured and Medicaid patients. In areas with a high uninsurance rate, which tend to be the medically underserved areas where CHCs operate, there is often a lack of availability of specialty care.

Chronic disease management 
Compared with patients who receive care from private providers, CHC patients are almost three times more likely to seek care for serious and chronic conditions. However, with the exception of those with private insurance, CHC patients are also more likely to meet referral obstacles than comparable patients treated by private physicians. In one study investigated management of diabetes in CHCs, a majority of patients exhibited signs or symptoms of diabetes, but relatively few received comprehensive monitoring and management. Moreover, adherence to treatment protocols was low in CHCs, speaking both to the effectiveness of CHCs and to the social determinants of health that make CHC patients so vulnerable.

Financing
Community health centers rely on a combination of Medicaid payments, grant revenues, and other private and public funding sources to fund their operations. The sources of funding for health centers have changed significantly over time. Public Health Service Act grants under Section 330 were once a prominent source of funding for CHCs. Although 330 grants remain important to the financial viability of health centers, federal reimbursement policy under Medicaid has become their largest source of revenue. In 2008, Public Health Service Act grants comprised 18.3% of all CHC revenues. The expansion of CHCs has instead been largely funded by the growth in Medicaid resulting from eligibility expansions, coverage reforms, and modified payment rules. In 1985, Medicaid patients made up 28% of all CHC patients but only 15% of CHC revenues. By 2007, the share of Medicaid patients matched their share of revenues. In the same time period, grants for the uninsured decreased from 51% to 21%. In 2008, Medicaid payments had grown to account for 37% of all CHC revenues.

In 1989, Congress created the Federally Qualified Health Center (FQHC) program, which established a preferential payment policy for health centers by requiring "cost-based" reimbursement for both Medicaid and Medicare. The policy designated FQHC services as a mandatory Medicaid service that all states must cover and reimburse on a cost-related basis, using the Medicaid prospective payment system. The aim of these payment changes was to prevent health centers from using Section 330 and other grants (intended for the uninsured) to subsidize low Medicaid payment rates. The resulting payment structure reimbursed health centers on the basis of their actual costs for providing care, not by a rate negotiated with the state Medicaid agency or set by Medicare.

Medicaid's shift to a managed care delivery system in the 1990s required CHCs to again modify their financial structure. The implementation of managed care in Medicaid was intended to curb costs while providing patients with greater freedom to choose where they access care. However, the shift had adverse financial implications on safety net providers. Health centers largely lost money in their early experiences of contracting and assuming risk for Medicaid managed care patients. Uncertainty about financial viability also lead to concerns about the ability of CHCs to continue serving the uninsured. In 1997, to protect health centers under managed care, Congress mandated that state Medicaid agencies make a "wrap-around" payment to FQHCs to cover the difference between their costs for providing care and the rates they were receiving from managed care organizations (MCOs). Since the initial shift to managed care, Medicaid has helped a wider group of patients access consistent medical care.

The economic recession in the United States continues to pose significant challenges for community health centers. In 2002, President Bush launched the Health Center Expansion Initiative, to significantly increase access to primary health care services in 1,200 communities through new or expanded health center sites. However, these funds furthered disparity between CHCs, as they primarily benefitted larger, financially stable CHCs, rather than expanding and improving care in smaller clinics. In 2008, the Health Care Safety Net Act reauthorized the health centers program for four years with the expectation of expanding the program by 50% over the time period. In 2009, the American Recovery and Reinvestment Act (ARRA) appropriated $2 billion for investment in health center expansion. By 2010, assisted by funding received through the ARRA, health centers had expanded to serve more than 18 million people. The health center program's annual federal funding grew from $1.16 billion in the 2001 fiscal year to $2.6 billion in the 2011 fiscal year. Health centers served 24,295,946 patients in 2015.

After the September 30, 2017 expiration of the Community Health Center Fund (CHCF), 2018 funding finally passed in the House of Representatives and on November 6, 2017 was referred to the Senate Finance Committee as the CHIMES act. The CHCF accounts for approximately 70% of available grant funding for CHCs, and represents approximately 20% of revenue. In anticipation of the delay in funding for the 2018 fiscal year, CHCs froze hirings, laid off staff, reduced hours of operations, and took other actions while facing funding uncertainty. On February 9, 2018, the Bipartisan Budget Act authorized $3.8 billion for 2018, and $4 billion in 2019 for CHC funding. In addition, to address a shortage of family physicians in CHCs, the act also increased funding for HRSA's Teaching Health Centers Graduate Medical Education (THC-GME) programs, which provides residency training in community-based primary care settings, rather than hospitals. Additionally, on August 15, 2018, HRSA announced that it awarded $125 million in grants via its Quality Improvement grant program to 1,352 CHCs.

See also
 Clinic
 Community Health
 Eula Hall, Founder of the Mud Creek Clinic
 Federally Qualified Health Center
 Free clinic
 West Side Community Health Services

References

See also
Health Resources and Services Administration
United States Department of Health and Human Services

External links 
 Health Center Program
 National Association of Community Health Centers
 Community Health Centers of Central Florida
 Community Health Centers of the Central Coast (California)
 Community Health Center Association of Connecticut
 Community Health Center, Inc. (Middletown, Connecticut)

Clinics in the United States
Healthcare in the United States

ca:Centre d'Atenció Primària
de:Medizinisches Versorgungszentrum
es:Centro de salud
pt:Posto de saúde